The men's team event of the 2018 ITTF Team World Cup took place at the Copper Box Arena in London from 22 to 25 February 2018.

All times are local (GMT).

Medallists

Tournament

Seeding

Teams were seeded based on the ITTF World Ranking of the three highest-ranked players in each team, as at February 2018.

Group stage

The group stage took place from 22 to 23 February.

Group A

Group B

Group C

Group D

Knockout stage

The knockout stage took place from 23 to 25 February.

Quarterfinals

Semifinals

Final

References

External links

Tournament page on ITTF website

2018 ITTF Team World Cup
ITTF Team World Cup